Narayan Athawale (1932 - 2011) was a leader of Shiv Sena and a member of Lok Sabha, from 1996 to 1998, elected from Mumbai North Central. 
 He was a writer and trade unionist. He was also the president of Mumbai Marathi Patrakar Sangh in 1972.

References

Shiv Sena politicians
India MPs 1996–1997
Trade unionists from Maharashtra
Lok Sabha members from Maharashtra
Marathi-language writers
1932 births
2011 deaths
Marathi politicians